Do I Speak for the World is the eighth and final studio album by American R&B singer Gerald Levert. It was released by Elektra Records on November 30, 2004 in the United States. The album marked his final studio album with the label. This was also the last album to be released during his lifetime before his death in November 2006.

Critical reception

AllMusic editor Rob Theakston called Do I Speak for the World "an enjoyable listen and a fine return to form." He felt that the album "is a nice return to form for the Levert frontman's glory years. Too often his releases have been plagued with inconsistency and pandering to whatever fashionable R&B formula is hip at the moment. And while there are moments of faltering and filler laced in at times and the lyrical content hasn't left its safe harbor, his performances haven't been this consistently solid since 1998's Love & Consequences."

Track listing

Charts

Weekly charts

Year-end charts

References

2004 albums
Gerald Levert albums